Aldridge Hotel or Hotel Aldridge may refer to:

Aldridge Hotel (McAlester, Oklahoma), listed on the National Register of Historic Places (NRHP) in Pittsburg County, Oklahoma
Aldridge Hotel (Shawnee, Oklahoma), listed on the NRHP in Pottawatomie County, Oklahoma
Hotel Aldridge (Wewoka, Oklahoma), listed on the NRHP in Seminole County, Oklahoma